Barbara A. Favola (born June 21, 1955) is an American politician from the Commonwealth of Virginia. A Democrat, she has served in the Senate of Virginia since 2012, representing the 31st District, encompassing portions of Arlington, Fairfax, and Loudoun counties.

Political career
Favola has been a resident of Arlington since 1982.

From 1997 until 2012, Favola was a member of the Arlington County Board; she served as Chairman in 2000 and 2004 and Vice Chairman in 1999, 2003 and 2011.  She has been a board member since December 1997.

In 2006, Virginia Gov. Tim Kaine appointed Favola to a four-year term on the State Health Board.

Favola was a policy advisor for 15 years at the United States Department of Health and Human Services (HHS). Favola started her career at HHS as a Presidential Management Intern (PMI), and served in various policy and planning positions throughout the Department, with several assignments in the Office of the Secretary and the Office of the Assistant Secretary for Public Health. As part of the PMI experience, Ms. Favola also worked on the House Budget Committee in the U.S. House of Representatives.

State Senate
Favola was first elected to the Virginia Senate in 2011 in the 31st district, defeating Republican Caren Merrick with 58% of the vote. She was re-elected in 2015, defeating Republican George Forakis with 62% of the vote.

In 2019, Favola sponsored a bill that would protect individuals with a severe mental illness from receiving the death penalty.

References

1955 births
Living people
Democratic Party Virginia state senators
People from Arlington County, Virginia
United States Department of Health and Human Services officials
New York University alumni
Women state legislators in Virginia
County supervisors in Virginia
21st-century American politicians
21st-century American women politicians
20th-century American politicians
20th-century American women politicians